Michael Benedict P. Rodriguez (November 5, 1962 – February 14, 1997) was a Filipino actor and model. He got his start in show business when he was discovered by the filmmaker, a National Artist for Film, Lino Brocka, who cast him in a Close Up commercial in 1981. Often referred to as the "Filipino Christopher Reeve", he was most famous for his roles on the television sitcom Palibhasa Lalake and opposite Sharon Cuneta in the 1983 movie To Love Again.  

He was nominated three times—1995, 1989, and 1986 respectively as Best Supporting Actor in the Filipino Academy of Movie Arts and Sciences Awards (also known as the FAMAS Awards) for the films The Elsa Castillo Story (1994), Ibulong Mo sa Diyos (1988), and Partida (1985). He won the award in 1989 for playing the role of Mario Umali—a dance choreographer who raped the main protagonist, Monica Quijano (played by Vilma Santos)—in Ibulong Mo sa Diyos.

Other works and retirement
Rodriguez was also known for having appeared with Snooky Serna in the 1984 film Experience in which he played the character who protected Snooky from a person stalking her. 

Notably, he starred as the Filipino-Spanish Ilustrado, Alfonsito, in the 1985 award-winning and daring period film Virgin Forest directed by the celebrated and multi-awarded Filipino filmmaker, Peque Gallaga, and which musical score was provided by another film icon, Jaime Fabregas.

On June 26, 1986, Rodriguez and Edu Manzano hosted Bb. Pilipinas 1986 Grand Coronation Night, held at the Araneta Coliseum. Ms. Chiqui Hollman-Yulo anchored the event. Seven years later, Miguel and Peque will have worked again in the movie, Adventures of Gary Leon and Kuting.

He eventually became an action film star, appearing in Bir Mammud: Alyas Boy Muslim (1989), Hindi Kita Iiwanang Buhay: Kapitan Paile (1990) and Hanggang Kailan Ka Papatay (1990).

He retired from acting in 1996 after the release of Huwag Mong Isuko ang Laban, the last film he worked on in 1995.

Personal life and death
He married popular fashion stylist and socialite Irene Salud on March 14, 1987, at the St. Pancratius Chapel, Paco Park, Manila. Actor Fernando Poe Jr. and Lily Monteverde of Regal Films were among their principal sponsors. 

On February 14, 1997, Rodriguez was found dead by a household help at his home in BF Homes, Parañaque. He died from pancreatitis at the age of 34.

Filmography

Television

Film

Awards and nominations

Notes

References

External links
 

1961 births
1997 deaths
20th-century Filipino male actors
ABS-CBN personalities
Burials at the Manila Memorial Park – Sucat
Deaths from pancreatitis
Filipino male film actors
Filipino people of Spanish descent
People from Las Piñas